Cerro Doña Ana is a mountain in the Andes of Chile. It has a height of 5690 metres.

See also
List of mountains in the Andes

Dona Ana